Sarbanes may refer to:

Paul Sarbanes (1933–2020), former United States Senator from Maryland
Janet Sarbanes, American writer
John Sarbanes (born 1962), Member of the U.S. House of Representatives from Maryland's 3rd district and son of Paul Sarbanes
Sarbanes–Oxley Act, a United States federal law sponsored by Paul Sarbanes and Michael G. Oxley